Hicanodon is a genus of South American tangled nest spiders containing the single species, Hicanodon cinerea. It was  first described by Albert Tullgren in 1901, and has only been found in Chile and Argentina.

References

External links

Amaurobiidae
Monotypic Araneomorphae genera
Spiders of South America